Lonesome is an Australian drama film, directed by Craig Boreham and released in 2022. The film centres on Casey (Josh Lavery), a young man who grew up on a ranch in rural Australia but moves to Sydney when he is rejected by his father after being outed as gay.

The film's cast also includes Daniel Gabriel as Tib, a casual sexual hookup with whom Casey gradually develops a deeper emotional and romantic connection, and Ian Roberts as Pietro, an older gay man who offers Casey work as a houseboy.

The film entered production in Sydney in June 2021.

The film was acquired for distribution by M-Appeal, and previewed at the European Film Market. It premiered in April 2022 at the Seattle International Film Festival, and was screened at the Inside Out Film and Video Festival in May, before having its Australian premiere at the Sydney Film Festival in June.

References

External links
 

2022 films
Australian coming-of-age drama films
Australian LGBT-related films
2022 LGBT-related films
LGBT-related drama films
LGBT-related coming-of-age films
Gay-related films
2020s English-language films
Films directed by Craig Boreham
2020s Australian films